Caleb Southern (born December 26, 1969) is an American professor at the Georgia Institute of Technology, musician and record producer. He has worked with Ben Folds Five, Fear of Pop and Archers of Loaf. As of 2002, he was a member of Partners Against Crime, District 5. Ben Folds has called him the "fourth member" of Ben Folds Five. 
Currently, he teaches at Georgia Institute of Technology. He is widely regarded as one of the best professors and lecturers in the college of computing

Select Production Credits
 Archers of Loaf, Icky Mettle
 Ben Folds Five, Ben Folds Five
 Ben Folds Five, Whatever and Ever Amen
 Ben Folds Five, The Unauthorized Biography of Reinhold Messner

References

1969 births
Living people
Record producers from North Carolina
Musicians from Durham, North Carolina